Brian "B.J." Johnson (born March 7, 1974) is a retired American soccer midfielder who spent five seasons in Major League Soccer with the Kansas City Wizards. He is currently the boys' Director of Technical Development and USL League Two head coach for Tampa Bay United.

Player
In 1992, Johnson graduated from Granada High School in Livermore, California.  He attended the Fresno State University, playing on the men's soccer team from 1992 to 1996.  He spent the 1995 season training with the U.S. Olympic soccer team.  In 1996, he returned to Fresno State where he was a 1996 Third Team All American.  Johnson completed his degree and graduated from Excelsior College in 2004.  In 1993, he played for the United States U-20 men's national soccer team at the 1993 FIFA World Youth Championship.  In February 1997, the Kansas City Wizards selected Johnson in the first round (seventh overall) of the 1997 MLS College Draft.  The Wizards sent him on loan to the Nashville Metros for the first half of the season.  He returned to the Wizards in July and saw limited playing time through the end of the season.  He had become a regular by 2000 when the Wizards won the 2000 MLS Cup.  His playing time rapidly dwindled in 2001 and he went on loan to the Pittsburgh Riverhounds of the USL A-League.  The Wizards released Johnson at the end of the season and he signed with the Riverhound where he finished his career in 2002.

Coach
In 2003, Ohio State University hired Johnson as an assistant with its men's soccer team.  In January 2005, he moved to Real Salt Lake of Major League Soccer as an assistant coach.  In 2010, he left Real Salt Lake to become an assistant with the West Virginia Mountaineers.

References

External links
 
 
 West Virginia Mounaineers
 Tampa Bay United bio

1974 births
Living people
American soccer coaches
American soccer players
Fresno State Bulldogs men's soccer players
Sporting Kansas City players
Major League Soccer players
Nashville Metros players
Pittsburgh Riverhounds SC players
Sacramento Scorpions players
A-League (1995–2004) players
People from Livermore, California
United States men's under-20 international soccer players
MLS Pro-40 players
Sporting Kansas City draft picks
Real Salt Lake non-playing staff
Soccer players from California
People from Carmichael, California
Association football midfielders
Ohio State Buckeyes men's soccer coaches
West Virginia Mountaineers men's soccer coaches
USL League Two coaches
Sportspeople from Alameda County, California